The 1936 Hungarian Grand Prix was a Grand Prix motor race held on 21 June 1936 at Népliget Park in Budapest.

Entries

Classification

† Martin and Hartmann swapped grid positions for tactical reasons.

Starting grid positions

† Martin and Hartmann swapped grid positions for tactical reasons.

References

Session results taken from:
 
 
 

Hungarian Grand Prix
Hungarian
Grand Prix